The 2021–22 Rugby Europe Super Cup is the first edition of the Rugby Europe Super Cup, an annual rugby union competition for professional franchises and clubs outside the three 'big leagues' of European Rugby.

Each participant will play home and away-fixtures in six rounds of action played between September and December. At the end of the pool stage, the top two teams of each conference will qualify for the semi-finals, which will be played during April 2022, with the conference winners hosting the ties. 

The final between Lusitanos XV representing Lisbon, Portugal, and The Black Lion representing Tbilisi, Georgia, took place on 7 May 2022 to crown the inaugural champion of the Rugby Europe Super Cup. Georgian professional side The Black Lion took the crown.

Group stage 

Eight clubs or franchises, representing seven nations took part in the initial group stage; two from Russia, and one each from Georgia and Israel (the four forming the Eastern Conference) and one each from the Netherlands, Spain, Belgium and Portugal (forming the Western Conference). As a result of the Russo-Ukraine War, the Russian franchises were excluded from the latter parts of the competition.

Eastern conference

Round 1

Round 2

Round 3

Round 4

Round 5

Round 6

Western conference

Round 1

Round 2

Round 3

Round 4

Round 5

Round 6

Play-Offs

Semi-finals

Final

Notes

References

Rugby Europe Super Cup
Rugby Europe Super Cup
Rugby Europe Super Cup